INS Nirupak (J20) (Hindi: निरूपक lit. Indicator) is a  hydrographic survey ship in the Indian Navy. The ship was built by Garden Reach Shipbuilders & Engineers and commissioned into the Indian navy at Visakhapatnam naval base in 1985 under Eastern Naval Command.

Equipment
The ship is equipped with ROV, AUV & USV. Apart from a helicopter and Bofors 40 mm gun for self defense, the ship is also equipped with four survey motor boats and two small boats. As a hospital ship, Nirupak has taken part in disaster relief exercises. On a goodwill mission in 2010 the ship visited Trincomalee Port.

Tasks
The primary tasks of INS Nirupak include hydrographic surveys, nautical chart preparation, cartography & training.  The ship also has disaster relief capabilities because it can operate as a hospital.

Operations
Nirupak was one of the first ships of the Indian Navy alongside  to be involved in relief operations after a 2004 Tsunami where it provided relief operations under Operation Gambhir as a hospital ship to Indonesia. In 2016 the ship was also involved in searching for the missing Antonov 32 of the Indian Navy that crashed over the Bay of Bengal. However, the aircraft is still missing.

References

1981 ships
Sandhayak-class survey ships
Ships built in India